Seacoast Career School is a technical school career college located in Sanford, Maine that was founded in 1995, as Seacoast Works Business School. Originally the school focused on practical business skills preparing students for entry-level positions in business offices. Since Premier Education Group acquired the school in 2001, the name and focus of the school has changed. Now called Seacoast Career School, the focus of the educational experience is based upon hands-on application in the medical field.

Programs 
Seacoast programs include training to become a professional medical assistant. a massage therapist.

Accreditation 

Seacoast is accredited by the following accrediting bodies:
 Accrediting Council for Continuing Education and Training (ACCET)
 Maine Department of Education
 State of New Hampshire Post-Secondary Education Commission
 Maine State Approving Agency for Veterans Education
 New Hampshire State Agency for Veterans Education

External links
 Seacoast Official Website 
 ACCET Official Website

Health sciences schools in the United States
For-profit universities and colleges in the United States
Companies based in Maine
1995 establishments in the United States
Companies based in Manchester, New Hampshire
Universities and colleges in York County, Maine